Lasha Monaselidze (born 2 January 1977) is a retired Georgian professional football player.

External links
Profile at Footballfacts.ru

1977 births
Living people
Footballers from Georgia (country)
Expatriate footballers from Georgia (country)
Expatriate footballers in Russia
Expatriate footballers in Greece
Russian Premier League players
FC Torpedo Moscow players
FC Torpedo-2 players
FC Dinamo Tbilisi players
Georgia (country) international footballers
Association football midfielders
PFC Krylia Sovetov Samara players
FC Torpedo Vladimir players